The Last Don Live is a live album by Don Omar. The second CD contains 3 studio tracks: Pobre Diabla and the 2 versions of Carta A Un Amigo. The album sold over 1,000,000 copies worldwide. It was nominated for a Latin Grammy Award for Best Urban Music Album in the Latin Grammys of 2005, Lo Nuestro Award for Urban Album of the Year in the Premio Lo Nuestro 2005 and Reggaeton Album Of The Year in the 2005 Latin Billboard Music Awards but won none.

Track listing

CD

The last three song on disc 2 are studio recorded songs. Meaning they're not from a live performance nor concert.

DVD

Musical Director: Ledif Franceschini

Charts

Weekly charts

Year-end charts

Sales and certifications

See also
List of Billboard Tropical Albums number ones from the 2000s

References

Don Omar live albums
2004 live albums
2004 video albums
Live video albums
Albums produced by Luny Tunes
Spanish-language live albums